McNeil "Doby" Bartling Jr. (June 1, 1913 – October 9, 1992) was an American football player and coach of football, basketball, and baseball. He served as head football coach at Vanderbilt University from 1944 to 1945 and at Millsaps College from 1946 to 1950, compiling a career college football record of 24–18–2. Bartling was also the head basketball coach at Millsaps from 1946 to 1951, tallying a mark of 25–63, and the head baseball coach at the school from 1947 to 1949, amassing a record of 15–31. He played football as a quarterback at the University of Mississippi. Bartling came to Vanderbilt in 1943 as an assistant coach after coaching at Meridian High School in Meridian, Mississippi.

Bartling was inducted into the Mississippi Sports Hall of Fame in 1977. He died of heart failure, on October 9, 1992, at Mississippi Baptist Medical Center in Jackson, Mississippi.

Head coaching record

College football

References

External links
 

1913 births
1992 deaths
American football quarterbacks
Millsaps Majors baseball coaches
Millsaps Majors football coaches
Millsaps Majors men's basketball coaches
Ole Miss Rebels football players
Vanderbilt Commodores football coaches
High school basketball coaches in Mississippi
High school football coaches in Mississippi
People from Itta Bena, Mississippi
Coaches of American football from Mississippi
Players of American football from Mississippi
Baseball coaches from Mississippi
Basketball coaches from Mississippi